Lorentzianthus is a monotypic genus of South American flowering plants in the boneset tribe within the sunflower family. The only known species is Lorentzianthus viscidus, native to Bolivia and Argentina.

References

Flora of South America
Monotypic Asteraceae genera
Eupatorieae